Szyszki may refer to the following places:
Szyszki, Lublin Voivodeship (east Poland)
Szyszki, Podlaskie Voivodeship (north-east Poland)
Szyszki, Silesian Voivodeship (south Poland)